Chromodoris michaeli is a species of colourful sea slug, a dorid nudibranch, a marine gastropod mollusk in the family Chromodorididae.

Distribution
Chromodoris michaeli is widespread in the Philippines.

Description
The upper surface of the body appears powdery blue, with white, black and orange bands encircling the mantle along the edges. Said black band is usually wider towards the middle. Within the boundaries of the black band there are a few black spots. The edge of the triangular bluish foot is orange and extended posteriorly beyond the notum. The sensory tentacles (the antennae-like rhinophores) and the main respiratory organs (gills) are orange.

Habitat

Ecology
Chromodoris michaeli, like many other nudibranchs, feeds on sponges. It has been reported to eat Negombata sp. (family Podospongiidae).

References

Chromodorididae
Molluscs of the Philippines
Molluscs of the Pacific Ocean
Gastropods described in 1998